= Alexander Pingol =

Alexander Jorge "Aljo" Pingol (born September 24, 1974) is a Filipino visual artist. Pingol was born in Malabon, Manila. He was the first son of Joselito G. Pingol Jr. and Elizabeth S. Pingol. He took Bachelor of Fine Arts under the Advertising arts program in University of Santo Tomas and graduated in 1996. Pingol's career was started out in animation and advertising. In 1998-2000, Pingol worked in Toonwoork Animation House as a 2D artist.

== Artistic development and career ==
Pingol's works characterizes a numerous styles and movements, from surrealism to a natural sense of peaceful life. Most of his works are influenced by Marc Chagall, Salvador Dalí, Pablo Picasso, and Hieronymus Bosch. His works are done by pastel, acrylic paint and oil paint. His works are characterized by modern figurative subjects done in a surrealistic style.

Pingol was noted within the art world. He is 2nd placer in the Nuclear Free Philippines Coalition Art Competition in 1989. In Far East Broadcasting Art Competition in 2002, he got the 1st place and nominated as the Valenzuela artist of the year in 2007. Pingol was also a 1st placer in FEBC Christmas Cars National Painting Competition.

== Works ==
- Kalesa
- Orange Gatherers
- Golden Afternoon
- Evening Promenade
- Cotton Candy Vendor II
- Egg Vendor
- Favorite Afternoon Snack
- Sorbetero
- Taho Vendor
- Growing Old With You
- Fisherboy
- Higher Ground
- Night Harvest
- Fisherman Prize
- Daydreaming in Black & White

== See also ==
- Folk Art
- Marc Chagall
- University of Santo Tomas
- Modernism
- Surrealism
